Verušičky is a municipality and village in Karlovy Vary District in the Karlovy Vary Region of the Czech Republic. It has about 500 inhabitants.

Administrative parts

References

Villages in Karlovy Vary